Olav Steinar Namtvedt (born 9 April 1947) is a Norwegian politician for the Centre Party.

He served as a deputy representative to the Norwegian Parliament from Hordaland during the terms 1993–1997 and 2001–2005.

On the local level he was the mayor of Radøy until 2007.

References
 

1947 births
Living people
Centre Party (Norway) politicians
Deputy members of the Storting
Mayors of places in Hordaland
Place of birth missing (living people)
21st-century Norwegian politicians
People from Radøy